Gao Jun (born January 25, 1969) is a Chinese American table tennis player.

Biography
Gao Jun was born in Baoding, Hebei province of China. She now resides in Southern California. She is the owner of California Table Tennis club in Rosemead, CA.

She won a silver medal at the 1992 Summer Olympics in the women's double event, with Chen Zihe for the Chinese National Team. She moved to the U.S. in 1994 and became a U.S. citizen. She competed for the United States in three consecutive Olympic Games from 2000 to 2008. In 2009, Gao was inducted into the USATT Hall of Fame.

Gao is a nine-time U.S. women's champion. She also has won eleven U.S. national titles in women's doubles and eight titles in mixed doubles with various partners. She was ranked number 1 in the U.S. prior to the 2012 London Olympics but pulled out of the North American Olympic trials due to an injury.

See also
 List of table tennis players
 List of World Table Tennis Championships medalists

References

 2008 Olympic profile

1969 births
Living people
American female table tennis players
Chinese female table tennis players
Table tennis players at the 1992 Summer Olympics
Olympic table tennis players of China
Olympic silver medalists for China
Table tennis players at the 2000 Summer Olympics
Table tennis players at the 2004 Summer Olympics
Table tennis players at the 2007 Pan American Games
Table tennis players at the 2008 Summer Olympics
Olympic table tennis players of the United States
American sportswomen of Chinese descent
Olympic medalists in table tennis
Asian Games medalists in table tennis
American sportspeople of Chinese descent
Chinese emigrants to the United States
Table tennis players at the 1990 Asian Games
Medalists at the 1992 Summer Olympics
Pan American Games medalists in table tennis
Pan American Games gold medalists for the United States
Table tennis players from Baoding
Naturalised table tennis players
Asian Games gold medalists for China
Asian Games silver medalists for China
Asian Games bronze medalists for China
Medalists at the 1990 Asian Games
Medalists at the 2007 Pan American Games
21st-century American women